Saint Vincent and the Grenadines competed at the 2015 World Championships in Athletics in Beijing, China, from 22 to 30 August 2015.

Results

Women 
Track and road events

References

Nations at the 2015 World Championships in Athletics
World Championships in Athletics
Saint Vincent and the Grenadines at the World Championships in Athletics